The 2005 Cincinnati Bengals season was the franchise's 36th season in the National Football League (NFL), the 38th overall, and the third under head coach Marvin Lewis. It was the team's first season with a winning record, playoff berth, and division title since 1990. In the fourteen seasons and 224 games in between (1991–2004), the Bengals' record was 71–153, a 0.317 winning percentage. It would be the Bengals' lone playoff appearance in a span of 18 years (1991–2008). Quarterback Carson Palmer got off to a strong start on his way to a solid 3836-yard season with 32 touchdown passes, earning a trip to the Pro Bowl. Receiving many of Palmer's passes was Chad Johnson, who followed teammate Palmer to the Pro Bowl in Hawaii, racking up an impressive 1,432 yards in receiving with nine touchdowns, many of which were followed by unique celebrations that made him a regular star on the sports highlight shows.

Following a 42–29 win over the Baltimore Ravens, the Bengals faced the Pittsburgh Steelers, this time in Pittsburgh, where the Bengals offense continued to fly behind Carson Palmer, who had three touchdown passes and 227 yards passing in an impressive 38–31 win that gave the Bengals first place in the AFC North at 9–3. The Bengals would not relinquish first place, winning the next two games to clinch the division with two weeks to go. On December 18, with a 41–17 win over the Detroit Lions, the Bengals clinched a playoff spot.  After clinching the division the Bengals played cautiously and dropped their final two games to finish with an 11–5 record, beating out the eventual Super Bowl champion Pittsburgh Steelers, who finished with an identical record, on a tiebreaker situation.

However, a costly loss to the Steelers in the wild card round extended their playoff win drought to 16 years.

Offseason

NFL Draft

Personnel

Roster

Regular season
In addition to their regular games with AFC North rivals, the Bengals played teams from the AFC South and NFC North as per the schedule rotation, and also played intraconference games against the Bills and the Chiefs based on divisional positions from 2004.

Schedule

Note: Intra-divisional opponents are in bold text

Week 1

    
    
    
    
    
    
    
    

Rudi Johnson 26 Rush, 126 Yds

Week 8 vs Packers

Standings

Postseason

Wild Card vs Steelers

On January 8, 2006, the Cincinnati Bengals took on the Pittsburgh Steelers in the opening round of the playoffs, making it the Bengals’ first playoff appearance of the decade. Early in the game, disaster struck for the Bengals when Steelers lineman Kimo von Oelhoffen hit Bengals quarterback Carson Palmer's knee, resulting in a tear of Palmer's anterior cruciate ligament (ACL). Backup quarterback Jon Kitna took over and did very well, giving Cincinnati leads of 10–0 and 17–7 at points of the game. All seemed well for the Bengals until the Steelers came back  with 24 unanswered points and upset the Cincinnati Bengals with a final score of 31–17.  The Steelers went on to win the Super Bowl.

With the costly loss, the Bengals season ended at 11–6, thus once again it extended their playoff win drought to 16 years.

Team leaders

Passing

Rushing

Receiving

Defensive

Kicking and punting

Special teams

Awards and records

Pro Bowl Selections
 Carson Palmer QB, AFC Pro-Bowl Selection
 Rudi Johnson RB, AFC Pro-Bowl Selection
 Chad Johnson WR, AFC Pro-Bowl Selection
 Willie Anderson RT, AFC Pro-Bowl Selection
 Deltha O'Neal CB, AFC Pro-Bowl Selection

All-Pro Award
 Chad Johnson WR, 1st Team All-Pro
 Willie Anderson RT, 1st Team All-Pro
 Deltha O'Neal CB, 1st Team All-Pro

Milestones
Carson Palmer's first six starts of the season, combined with his last three starts of 2004, made him only the second passer in NFL history to post nine straight games with a passer rating of 100 or more (Peyton Manning, 2004)
Carson Palmer led the NFL in three major passing categories – TD passes (32), completion percentage (67.8) and TD-INT differential (32–12)
 Rudi Johnson, 2nd 1000 yard rushing season (1,458 yards)
 Chad Johnson 4th 1000 yard receiving season 
 Tab Perry, 1st 1000-yard return season (1,562 yards)

Records
Cincinnati Bengals Chad Johnson and T. J. Houshmandzadeh set Bengals records for most receptions (175) and receiving yards (2,388) by a duo.
The Bengals established a home season attendance record of 526,469 to break the mark of 524,248 set a season earlier.

References

External links
 
 2005 Cincinnati Bengals at Pro-Football-Reference.com

Cincinnati Bengals
AFC North championship seasons
Cincinnati Bengals seasons
Cincin